Sabrina the Teenage Witch is a 1996 American television film adaptation based on the comic book series of the same name from Archie Comics. It came before the Sabrina the Teenage Witch television series and premiered on Showtime on April 7, 1996.

The only two actors who would appear in both the film and television series would be Melissa Joan Hart, whose character possessed a different surname from her comic book and television counterpart, and Michelle Beaudoin, whose character was renamed for the television series. Also of note is the fact that, unlike the comics, which were set in the fictional town of Greendale,  and the eventual television series (located in an equally fictional town named Westbridge), the television film was said to take place in Riverdale. This was the name originally used in the comics for the home of Archie and his group of friends. 
Although set in the United States, just like the comics and said television series, the movie was shot entirely in British Columbia, Canada.

Plot
The movie centers around Sabrina Sawyer, who is sent to live with her eccentric aunts in Riverdale. On her 16th birthday, Sabrina discovers that she is a witch. Sabrina then develops a crush on Seth, the cutest boy in school who happens to be dating Katie La More, the school's "queen bee aka mean girl." Sabrina has to find a way to use her newly discovered magical power to get Seth to notice her, but at the same time not cast a love spell, which could backfire on her.

After Katie dumps Seth, he starts to notice Sabrina. Sabrina is able to use her magic to win a track competition and get Seth to ask her to the Spring Fling. Katie discovers Sabrina's secret and sets out to let everyone know what Sabrina is. Sabrina has to use her magic to turn Katie into a poodle to stop her but later changes her back. All the while, Harvey likes Sabrina and waits to see if she will have a change of heart and start to notice him. The story ends happily with Sabrina and Harvey together at the dance.

Cast
 Melissa Joan Hart as Sabrina Sawyer
 Sherry Miller as Aunt Hilda
 Charlene Fernetz as Aunt Zelda
 Michelle Beaudoin as Marnie Littlefield
 Ryan Reynolds as Seth
 Tobias Mehler as Harvey
 Lalainia Lindbjerg as Katie La More
 Laura Harris as Freddie
 Kea Wong as Fran
 Jo Bates as Coach
 Janine Cox as Sales Clerk
 Biski Gugushe as Larry
 Tyler Labine as Mark
 Jim Swansburg as Mr. Dingle
 Noel Geer as Jeff
 Jenna Leigh Green as Libby
 Brian Steele as Salem Saberhagen (uncredited voice)

Differences with the television series
In the film, Sabrina's last name is Sawyer and not Spellman as in the TV show.
In the film, Sabrina lives in Riverdale (same as Archie Andrews in the comics) and in the TV show lives in Westbridge.
In the TV show, she uses her finger to cast spells, but in the film, she just needs the power of her mind.
In the film, both her parents are witches, while in the TV show her father is a witch and her mother is mortal (non-witch).
In the film, Katie takes the part as the antagonist, while in the series it is Libby.
Michelle Beaudoin plays Marnie, Sabrina's unintelligent and unpopular friend, whereas in the first season of the TV show, her character (also Sabrina's best friend) is called Jenny and is quite clever.
Katie is more like a stereotypical cheerleader than Libby as she is blonde and slim, while Libby is dark-haired and curvy.
Harvey is "nerdy" in the film whereas in the TV series, he is more of a "jock".
In the TV show, Aunt Hilda is the rather unintelligent "fun Aunt" and Aunt Zelda is much more brilliant and serious.  In the film, both witches are quite clever, but Zelda is much more serious than Hilda.
Salem's voice actor is different.
In the TV show, Salem is much more self-centered and was turned into a cat for attempting to take over the world, while in the movie Salem is much more sophisticated and turned into a cat for kissing someone who did never really love him.
With the exception of Sabrina and Marnie/Jenny everyone in both the sitcom and film are played by different actors. For example: Harvey, Aunt Hilda and Aunt Zelda.
In the TV show, Sabrina is told she is a witch before she goes to school. In the film, she goes to school, not knowing she is a witch, but finds out the night of her 16th birthday by finding the spell book. In the series the aunts gave her the book.
In the film, Sabrina had a surprise birthday party with everyone from school, in the series, it was only the aunts and Salem.
In the film, Sabrina already knows Marnie/Jenny, which in the series she meets Jenny for the first time.

References

External links

1996 television films
1996 films
American teen comedy films
American fantasy comedy films
Films shot in British Columbia
Television films as pilots
Sabrina the Teenage Witch films
1990s fantasy comedy films
Showtime (TV network) films
Viacom Pictures films
1990s English-language films
Films directed by Tibor Takács
1990s American films